The sprint hurdles at the Summer Olympics have been contested over a variety of distances at the multi-sport event. The men's 110 metres hurdles has been present on the Olympic athletics programme since the first edition in 1896. A men's 200 metres hurdles was also briefly held, from 1900 to 1904. The first women's sprint hurdling event was added to the programme at the 1932 Olympics in the form of the 80 metres hurdles. At the 1972 Games the women's distance was extended to the 100 metres hurdles, which is the current international standard.

The Olympic records are 12.91 seconds for the men's 110 m hurdles, set by Liu Xiang in 2004, and 12.20 seconds for the women's 100 m hurdles, set by Kendra Harrison in 2016. The fastest time recorded at the Olympics for the men's 200 m hurdles was 24.6 seconds by 1904 winner Harry Hillman. Maureen Caird won the last women's Olympic 80 m hurdles race in 1968 with a record of 10.39 seconds. The men's 110 m hurdles world record has been broken at the Olympics on six occasions: 1908, 1928, 1932, 1936, 1972 and 2004. The women's 100 m hurdles world record has been broken only once, by Annelie Ehrhardt at the inaugural 1972 Olympic final. In contrast the 80 m hurdles world record was set at the Olympics in 1932 (four times), 1936, and 1952 (twice).

Only three athletes have won two Olympic sprint hurdles gold medals: on the men's side, Lee Calhoun, and Roger Kingdom, and on the women's side Shirley Strickland. Strickland is also the only athlete to win three such Olympic medals, having won a bronze medal before her victories. Alvin Kraenzlein is the only athlete to have won two hurdles medals at the same Olympics, having taken the 110 m and 200 m titles. Historically, hurdlers also competed in other individual sprinting events (Harrison Dillard and Fanny Blankers-Koen were also 100 metres Olympic champions), but this became rare after the 1950s.

The United States has been the most successful nation in the men's event with 19 gold medals and 56 medals in total. Though less dominant in the women's events, the U.S. also has the most women's gold medals, with five.

Medal summary

Men's 110 metres hurdles

Multiple medalists

Medals by country

Women's 80 metres hurdles

Multiple medalists

Medalists by country

 The German total includes teams both competing as Germany and the United Team of Germany, but not East or West Germany.

Women's 100 metres hurdles

Multiple medalists

Medalists by country

200 metres hurdles
For a brief period, a men's Olympic 200 metres low hurdles race was held. It was a relatively common event in the early 1900s. With only two appearances in 1900 and 1904, the event's removal as an Olympic event marked the beginning of a steady decline of its popularity over the course of the 20th century and it is now a rarity. The 1900 event was won by Alvin Kraenzlein, who won four gold medals that year, including the 110 m hurdles title. The second and final 200 m hurdles champion, Harry Hillman, was again a multiple gold medallist, as the American won the 400 metres sprint and 400 metres hurdles Olympic titles at that games.

Intercalated Games
The 1906 Intercalated Games were held in Athens and at the time were officially recognised as part of the Olympic Games series, with the intention being to hold a games in Greece in two-year intervals between the internationally held Olympics. However, this plan never came to fruition and the International Olympic Committee (IOC) later decided not to recognise these games as part of the official Olympic series. Some sports historians continue to treat the results of these games as part of the Olympic canon.

At this event a men's 110 m hurdles race was held. For the top two finishers, American hurdler Robert Leavitt and British athlete Alfred Healey, this was the peak of their respective careers. Bronze medalist Vincent Duncker of Germany was the joint 100 metres world record holder at the time.

References
Participation and athlete data
Men's 200 metres Hurdles Medalists. Sports Reference. Retrieved on 2014-02-07.
Men's 110 metres Hurdles Medalists. Sports Reference. Retrieved on 2014-02-07.
Women's 100 metres Hurdles Medalists. Sports Reference. Retrieved on 2014-02-07.
Women's 80 metres Hurdles Medalists. Sports Reference. Retrieved on 2014-02-07.
Olympic record progressions
Mallon, Bill (2012). TRACK & FIELD ATHLETICS - OLYMPIC RECORD PROGRESSIONS. Track and Field News. Retrieved on 2014-02-07.
Specific

External links
IAAF 110 metres hurdles homepage
IAAF 100 metres hurdles homepage
Official Olympics website
Olympic athletics records from Track & Field News

 
Olympics
Sprint hurdles